The Chief Economist of the International Monetary Fund (IMF) is also the economic counsellor and director of the fund's Research Department and is responsible for providing independent advice to the fund on its policy issues, integrating ideas of the research in the design of policies, conveying these ideas to the policymakers inside and outside the fund and managing all research done at IMF. The Chief Economist is a member of the Senior Leadership of the IMF.

"The job is one of the most prestigious in the field, and has been held by some of the most prominent academic researchers in international economics." The chief economist is part of the senior leadership team, directly advises the managing director, and leads about a hundred Ph.D. economists in the Research Department.

The Research Department publishes working papers on highly relevant policy and research issues in international economics; produces a number of reports including the widely tracked annual World Economic Outlook; organizes conferences including the annual research conference that brings together top economists and policymakers; and publishes the peer reviewed journal IMF Economic Review.

The position has been held by the following:

First woman Chief Economist of the IMF
After the announcement of Maurice Obstfeld's retirement in December 2018, Harvard professor Gita Gopinath, a leading scholar in exchange rates, sovereign debt and capital flows was appointed as chief economist of the International Monetary Fund (IMF). Gita Gopinath, the John Zwaanstra Professor of International Studies and Economics at Harvard University's economics department is the first woman to hold this position. Gopinath, who was born in India, received her Ph.D. in economics from Princeton University in 2001 after earning a B.A. from the University of Delhi and M.A. degrees from both the Delhi School of Economics and University of Washington. At Princeton's economics department, her Ph.D. advisors included two future Chief Economists of the IMF - Professor Ken Rogoff (2001-03) and Professor Pierre-Olivier Gourinchas (2022-25) and a future Chair of the Board of Governors of the Federal Reserve - Professor Ben Bernanke (2006-14). 

Gopinath is an elected fellow of the American Academy of Arts and Sciences and of the Econometric Society. She is the recipient of the Pravasi Bharatiya Samman, the highest honour conferred on overseas Indians by the Government of India, and the Distinguished Alumnus Award from the University of Washington. She was named among Bloomberg 50 people who defined 2019, Foreign Policy named her one of the Top Global Thinkers in 2019 and Time magazine named her among the Women who Broke Major Barriers to Become 'Firsts' in 2019. Earlier the IMF named her one of the top 25 economists under 45 in 2014, Financial Times named her one of the 25 Indians to Watch in 2012, and she was chosen as a Young Global Leader by the World Economic Forum in 2011. 

In December 2021, IMF Managing Director Kristalina Georgieva announced the elevation of Gita Gopinath as the Fund’s new First Deputy Managing Director.  Gopinath had been earlier scheduled to return to her academic position at Harvard University in January 2022 on completion of her term as Chief Economist.  Georgieva added that "given that the pandemic has led to an increase in the scale and scope of the macroeconomic challenges facing our member countries, Gita—universally recognized as one of the world’s leading macroeconomists—has precisely the expertise that we need for the FDMD role at this point. Indeed, her particular skill set—combined with her years of experience at the Fund as Chief Economist—make her uniquely well qualified. She is the right person at the right time.”

See also
Chief Economist of the World Bank

References

International Monetary Fund